Pasi Kouvalainen (born January 6, 1992) is a Finnish ice hockey player. He is currently playing with Peliitat Heinola in the Finnish Mestis.

Kouvalainen made his SM-liiga debut playing with KalPa during the 2012–13 SM-liiga season.

References

External links

1992 births
Living people
Finnish ice hockey forwards
Hokki players
Iisalmen Peli-Karhut players
KalPa players
KeuPa HT players
Lahti Pelicans players
Peliitat Heinola players
People from Pyhäjärvi
Sportspeople from North Ostrobothnia